Johannes Gjerdåker (15 February 1936 – 27 April 2020) was a Norwegian local historian, poet, translator, non-fiction writer and publisher.

Gjerdåker was born in Voss, and studied history and language at the University of Oslo. He made his literary debut in 1978 with the poetry collection . He wrote several works on local history of Voss and Hordaland. In 1992 he was awarded the cultural prize from the municipality of Voss. He received the Bastian Prize in 1997 and the Melsom Prize in 1999, both for translation of works by Robert Burns into Nynorsk. In 2005 he received the Critics Prize for the year's best work of translation, for translation of works by Horace. He died in April 2020.

References

1936 births
2020 deaths
People from Voss
University of Oslo alumni
20th-century Norwegian historians
Norwegian translators
Norwegian non-fiction writers
20th-century Norwegian poets
Nynorsk-language writers
Norwegian male poets
20th-century Norwegian male writers
Male non-fiction writers